Jay Chaudhry (born 1958) is an Indian-American billionaire entrepreneur and the CEO and founder of cloud security company Zscaler.

Early life 
Chaudhry was born in Panoh, a village in Una district of the state of Himachal Pradesh, India. His parents were small scale farmers.

He earned a bachelor's degree from the Institute of Technology, Banaras Hindu University (IT-BHU), and a master's in Computer Engineering, a Master's in Industrial Engineering and MBA from the University of Cincinnati.

Career 
In 1997, Chaudhry founded SecureIT (acquired by Verisign) and CipherTrust (acquired by Secure Computing Corporation).
He also founded AirDefense (acquired by Motorola) and CoreHarbor (acquired by AT&T). After Zscaler's March 2018 IPO, Chaudhry was reckoned to be a billionaire.

In 2018, Chaudhry was selected as a finalist for the EY Entrepreneur of the Year Award program in Northern California.

With a net worth of US$16.3 billion (as of October 2021), Chaudhry was included in the 2021 Forbes 400 list of richest people in America securing a rank of 45th in the list. He was among 7 Indian-Americans who made this list.

Personal life 
He is married to Jyoti, they have three children, and live in Reno, Nevada, US.

References 

1950s births
Living people
American billionaires
American company founders
American chief executives
Banaras Hindu University alumni
University of Cincinnati alumni
People from Saratoga, California
Indian emigrants to the United States
American people of Indian descent